Elopement is a 1951 American comedy film directed by Henry Koster and starring Clifton Webb, Anne Francis, Charles Bickford and William Lundigan.

Plot
Jacqueline "Jake" Osborne is sent to college to follow in the footsteps of her successful father Howard, but she falls in love with professor Matt Reagan. They impulsively decide to elope.

Howard and his wife are furious, but when they confront the young professor's parents, they find them equally irate. The parents hit the road together, hoping to prevent the marriage, while Jake and Matt begin to bicker and wonder if their decision was made in haste.

Cast
 Clifton Webb as Howard Osborne
 Anne Francis as Jacqueline "Jake" Osborne
 Charles Bickford as Tom Reagan
 William Lundigan as Matt Reagan
 Reginald Gardiner as Roger Evans
 Evelyn Varden as Millie Reagan
 Margalo Gillmore as Claire Osborne
 Tommy Rettig as Daniel Reagan

References

External links
 
 
 
 

1951 films
1951 comedy films
20th Century Fox films
American comedy films
American black-and-white films
1950s English-language films
Films scored by Alfred Newman
Films scored by Cyril J. Mockridge
Films directed by Henry Koster
1950s American films